Immolated is the first album by the Polish death metal band Dies Irae released in 2000 by Metal Blade Records. A video was filmed for the track "Lion Of Knowledge".

Track listing

Credits
Marcin "Novy" Nowak - bass, vocals
Maurycy "Mauser" Stefanowicz - guitars
Jacek Hiro - guitars
Krzysztof "Doc" Raczkowski - drums
Szymon Czech - sound engineering, producer  
Bartłomiej Kuźniak - mastering
Jacek Wiśniewski - cover art, layout
Mariusz Kmiołek - photography

References
 

2000 albums
Dies Irae (band) albums
Metal Blade Records albums
Metal Mind Productions albums